Éva "Vica" Kerekes (born 28 March 1981) is a Slovak actress of Hungarian ethnicity. She is active in Slovakia, the Czech Republic, and Hungary. She is often referred to and credited as Vica Kerekésová, Vica Kerekešová, and Kerekes Vica. She adopted the nickname "Vica" to distinguish herself from the Hungarian actress .

Biography
Vica Kerekes was born to ethnic Hungarian parents. After studying at the Academy of Performing Arts in Bratislava, she moved to Budapest in 2001, where she met her future husband, artist Csaba Vigh. She made her cinematic debut in 2004 with the Slovak film Konečná stanica. To international audiences, Kerekes is known for the 2011 film Men in Hope.
She divorced Vigh in 2012 after having lived with him for six years and being separated for a year.
In 2014, Kerekes announced that she was in a relationship with tattoo artist Lukáš Musil.

Awards and recognition
In 2010, Kerekes was awarded Best Actress at the Hungarian Film Week for her performance in Ki/Be Tawaret. In 2013, she was named Best Actress in Slovakia for her role in Seven Days of Sin. She is the winner of the 2017 Hungarian Film Award for Best Television Actress for her role in the television movie Tranzitidö.

Selected filmography

Film

Television

References

External links
 
 Vica Kerekes at Hungarian TV

1981 births
Living people
Slovak film actresses
Slovak stage actresses
Hungarians in Slovakia
Slovak expatriates in Hungary
People from Fiľakovo
20th-century Slovak actresses
21st-century Slovak actresses
Slovak expatriates in the Czech Republic